The Digital HiNote was a series of laptop computers manufactured by Digital Equipment Corporation from 1994 until 1998 and by Compaq from 1998 until 2002. It was generally positively reviewed by technology journalists. The series consisted of the VP and Ultra models which were based on the i486, Pentium, Pentium MMX and Pentium II. After Digital was acquired by Compaq in 1998, the series was phased out.

History 
Digital introduced the HiNote brand of laptops in November 1994 as a successor to their x86 laptops marketed under their DECpc brand. The HiNote was introduced simultaneously with the Venturis brand of desktop and towers, which similarly replaced those form factors of x86 computers that bore the DECpc name. The initial lineup comprised a full-sized laptop simply named the HiNote and a subnotebook named the HiNote Ultra; Digital later separated the two sub-brands by designating the former as VP units. Digital offered the initial lineup with either monochrome or color passive-matrix LCDs or color active-matrix LCDs, 33 MHz Intel 486SXs to 50 MHz 486DX2s, and a hard drive capacity between 120 and 340 MB. The standard HiNote included a built-in 3.5 inch floppy drive which could be removed and fitted with a second lithium-ion battery pack in its place, while the drive for the Ultra was external only. Both the original HiNotes proper and Ultras included built-in trackballs as its pointing device of choice.

Technology journalists singled out the HiNote Ultra for its sleek industrial design and modularity, which attached the lithium-ion battery to the back of the laptop with a latching mechanism instead of being inserted in the bottom case as was customary for laptop designs. This battery could be rotated to prop up the Ultra at a position more comfortable for typing for long periods of time and allowed it to accommodate the external 3.5-inch floppy disk drive underneath it when placed on a desk. It weighed 4 lb (1,8 kg) and measured only an inch (2,54 cm) high. Digital advertised on television the Ultra's thin and light stature by pulling it out of a manila envelope—an approach replicated by Apple nearly 15 years later, when it advertised its MacBook Air in 2008.

When Compaq acquired Digital in June 1998 for $9.6 billion, they left the design intact but changed the name to Armada 6500. The HiNote-based series was phased out in 2002. Technology writer Brooke Crothers wrote on CNET that its discontinuation was ironic considering that the HiNote received high industry accolades and was "one of the best notebook designs ever and one of the technological gems that Compaq inherited from Digital Equipment."

Models

References

Further reading

External links 
 Archived legacy product pages provided by Compaq:
 HiNote VP 500 line
 HiNote VP 700 line
 HiNote Ultra 2000 line
Digital HiNote Ultra II disassembly and repair
 Running Linux on the HiNote Ultra 2000
Digital HiNote Ultra in The Peacemaker on Starring the Computer

Computer-related introductions in 1994
HiNote
Subnotebooks